Emmaculate Chemtai (born 14 October 1993) is a Kenyan volleyball player playing as an opposite spiker. She is part of the Kenya women's national volleyball team.

Life
Chemtai participated in the 2018 FIVB Volleyball Women's World Championship and 2019 FIVB Women's World Cup. She is a member of the team in the women's tournament at the delayed 2020 Summer Olympics. The Kenya national team set off for the Olympics in Tokyo in three batches to try and minimise the chances of being effected by the COVID-19 pandemic. Their opening match will be on 25 July in Tokyo against Japan.

Clubs 
 2017-2018  Kenya Prisons

References 

1993 births
Living people
Kenyan women's volleyball players
Volleyball players at the 2020 Summer Olympics
Olympic volleyball players of Kenya